KVC may refer to:

K13VC (branded as KVC13), an independent television station in Austin, Texas, United States
Kankakee Valley Conference, a high school athletics conference in Indiana, United States
King Cove Airport (IATA code: KVC), Alaska, United States
King Videocable, an American broadcast cable television company
Kloss Video Corporation, a subsidiary of Advent Corporation
Komodo vs. Cobra, a 2005 American television film
KVC Health Systems, an American non-profit child welfare and behavioural healthcare organization

See also
K.V.C. Westerlo, a Belgian football club